Hib may refer to:

 Hib Milks, a Canadian Professional Hockey forward
 Haemophilus influenzae serotype b, and the corresponding Hib vaccine
 Chisholm-Hibbing Airport in Hibbing, Minnesota (IATA Code: HIB)
 Bergen University College, (Norwegian: Høgskolen i Bergen or HiB)
 The acronym standing for harassment, intimidation, and bullying in an educational setting